(Charles Guy) Rodney Leach, Baron Leach of Fairford (1 June 1934 – 12 June 2016) was a British businessman and a Conservative member of the House of Lords.

Early life

The son of Charles Harold Leach and Nora Eunice Ashworth, Leach was educated at Harrow School and Balliol College, Oxford.

Business and political career
Leach was Deputy Chairman of Jardine Lloyd Thompson Plc,
a director of Rothschild Continuation AG and of various listed Jardine Matheson Group companies.

He was created a life peer on 6 June 2006 taking the title Baron Leach of Fairford, of Fairford in the County of Gloucestershire.

In 1998, at a time when the prime minister Tony Blair was positioning the United Kingdom to join the Eurozone, with the full-hearted support of the CBI and many members of the business establishment, Leach founded Business for Sterling to co-ordinate the case against this. The lobby group gradually recruited a thousand chairmen and chief executives to its cause and gathered momentum around the country until the pro-euro side largely faded away. But when asked whether he had personally saved Britain from a dangerous fate, Leach was self-effacing: “If there was credit it should be spread very, very broadly. I was just the chairman.”

From 2005, Leach served as chairman of Open Europe, an influential think-tank  based in London and Brussels and with a partner organisation in Berlin. calling for fundamental reform of the European Union.  He spoke in the House of Lords against what he called 'alarmism' over climate change.

Leach was the chairman of the No2AV campaign, which opposed a change in the British electoral system away from first-past-the-post voting during the 2011 United Kingdom Alternative Vote referendum.

Personal life
Leach was married twice. His first marriage was to Felicity Ballantyne in 1963, with the couple divorcing in 1989. His second marriage was to Jessica Violet Gwynne in 1993.

Leach had two sons and three daughters from his first marriage.

Styles
 Mr Rodney Leach (1934–2006)
 The Rt. Hon. The Lord Leach of Fairford (2006–2016)

References

External links
Lord Leach on They Work For You

1934 births
2016 deaths
Alumni of Balliol College, Oxford
People educated at Harrow School
Conservative Party (UK) life peers
People from Fairford
N M Rothschild & Sons people
Life peers created by Elizabeth II